Aage Jørgensen may refer to:
 Aage Jørgensen (gymnast)
 Aage Jørgensen (footballer)

See also
 Aage Winther-Jørgensen, Danish actor